Galen John Strawson (born 1952) is a British analytic philosopher and literary critic who works primarily on philosophy of mind, metaphysics (including free will, panpsychism, the mind-body problem, and the self), John Locke, David Hume, Immanuel Kant and Friedrich Nietzsche. He has been a consultant editor at The Times Literary Supplement for many years, and a regular book reviewer for The Observer, The Sunday Times, The Independent, the Financial Times and The Guardian. He is the son of philosopher P. F. Strawson. He holds a chair in the Department of Philosophy at the University of Texas, Austin, and taught for many years before that at the University of Reading, City University of New York, and Oxford University.

Education and career
Strawson, the elder son of Oxford philosopher P. F. Strawson, was educated at the Dragon School, Oxford (1959–65), where he won a scholarship to Winchester College (1965–68). He left school at 16, after completing his A-levels and winning a place at Trinity Hall, Cambridge. At Cambridge, he read Oriental Studies (1969–71), Social and Political Science (1971–72), and Moral Sciences (1972–73) before moving to the University of Oxford, where he received his BPhil in philosophy in 1977 and his DPhil in philosophy in 1983. He also spent a year as an auditeur libre (audit student) at the École Normale Supérieure in Paris and at the Université Paris 1 Panthéon-Sorbonne as a French Government Scholar (1977–78).

Strawson taught at the University of Oxford from 1979 to 2000, first as a Stipendiary Lecturer at several different colleges, and then, from 1987 on, as Fellow and Tutor of Jesus College, Oxford. In 1993, he was a Visiting Research Fellow at the Research School of Social Sciences, Canberra. He has also taught as a Visiting Professor at NYU (1997), Rutgers University (2000), the Massachusetts Institute of Technology (2010) and the Ecole des hautes études en sciences sociales, Paris (2012). In 2011 he was an Old Dominion Fellow, Council of the Humanities, Princeton University (2011). In 2000, he moved to the University of Reading as professor of philosophy, and was also Distinguished Professor of Philosophy from 2004 to 2007 at the City University of New York Graduate Center. In 2012, he joined the faculty at the University of Texas, Austin, as holder of a new chair in philosophy.

Philosophical work

Free will
In the free will debate, Strawson holds that there is a fundamental sense in which free will is impossible, whether determinism is true or not. He argues for this position with what he calls his "basic argument", which aims to show that no-one is ever ultimately morally responsible for their actions, and hence that no one has free will in the sense that usually concerns us. In its simplest form, the basic argument runs thus:

 You do what you do, in any given situation, because of the way you are.
 To be ultimately responsible for what you do, you have to be ultimately responsible for the way you are—at least in certain crucial mental respects.
 But you cannot be ultimately responsible for the way you are in any respect at all.
 So you cannot be ultimately responsible for what you do.

This argument resembles Arthur Schopenhauer's position in On the Fourfold Root of the Principle of Sufficient Reason, summarised by E. F. J. Payne as the "law of motivation, which states that a definite course of action inevitably ensues on a given character and motive".

Panpsychism

Strawson has argued that what he calls "realistic physicalism" (or "realistic monism") entails panpsychism. He writes that "as a real physicalist, then, I hold that the mental/experiential is physical." He quotes the physicist Arthur Eddington in support of his position as follows: "If we must embed our schedule of indicator readings in some kind of background, at least let us accept the only hint we have received as to the significance of the background—namely that it has a nature capable of manifesting itself as a mental activity. The editor of the Journal of Consciousness Studies, Anthony Freeman, has written that panpsychism is regarded by many as either "plain crazy, or else a direct route back to animism and superstition". But it has a long tradition in Western thought.

Publications

Books
Freedom and Belief (1986), 
The Secret Connexion (1989), 
Mental Reality (1994), 
The Self? (editor) (2005), 
Consciousness and Its Place in Nature: Does physicalism entail panpsychism? (2006), 
Real Materialism and Other Essays (2008), 
Selves: An Essay in Revisionary Metaphysics (2009), 
The Evident Connexion: Hume on Personal Identity (2011), 
Locke on Personal Identity: Consciousness and Concernment (2011), 
The Subject of Experience (2017), 
Things That Bother Me: Death, Freedom, The Self etc. (2018) (New York Review of Books Inc.)

Selected articles
"Red and 'Red'" (1989), Synthèse 78, pp. 193–232.
"The Impossibility of Moral Responsibility" (1994), Philosophical Studies 75, pp. 5–24.
"'The Self" (1997), Journal of Consciousness Studies 4, pp. 405–28.
 "The bounds of freedom" (2001), in The Oxford Handbook on Free Will, ed. R. Kane (Oxford University Press), pp. 441–60.
 "Hume on himself" (2001), in Essays in Practical Philosophy: From Action to values, ed. D. Egonsson, J. Josefsson, B. Petersson & T. Rønnow-Rasmussen(Aldershot: Ashgate Press), pp. 69–94.
"Real Materialism"  (2003), in Chomsky and his Critics, ed. L. Antony & N. Hornstein (Oxford: Blackwell), pp. 49–88.
"Mental ballistics: the involuntariness of spontaneity" (2003), Proceedings of the Aristotelian Society, pp. 227–56.
 "A Fallacy of our Age" (‘Against Narrative’) in the Times Literary Supplement, 15 October 2004
"Against Narrativity"  (2004,) Ratio 17, pp. 428–52.
 "Gegen die Narrativität" (2005), revised and expanded version of "Against Narrativity" in Deutsche Zeitschrift für Philosophie 53, pp. 3–22.
"Episodic ethics" (2005) in "Narrative and Understanding Person", ed. D. Hutto (Cambridge: Cambridge University Press), pp. 85–115.
"Why I have no future" (2009) The Philosophers' Magazine, Issue 38
 "Against 'corporism': the two uses of I" (2009) Organon F 16, pp. 428–448.
 "The Self" in The Oxford Handbook of Philosophy of Mind, ed. B. McLaughlin & A. Beckermann (Oxford University Press), pp. 541–64.
 "5 Questions on Mind and Consciousness" (2009), in Mind and Consciousness: 5 Questions (AutomaticPress/VIP,) pp. 191–204.
 "5 Questions on Action" (2009), in Philosophy of Action: 5 Questions (AutomaticPress/VIP), pp. 253–9.
 "On the SESMET theory of subjectivity" (2009),  in Mind That Abides, ed. D. Skrbina (Amsterdam: John Benjamins), pp. 57–64.
 "The identity of the categorical and the dispositional" (2008), Analysis 68/4, pp. 271–8.
 "Radical Self-Awareness" (2010), in Self, No Self?: Perspectives from Analytical, Phenomenological, and Indian Traditions, ed. M. Siderits, E. Thompson, and D. Zahavi (Oxford University Press), pp. 274–307.
 "The depth(s) of the twentieth century" (2010), Analysis 70/4:1.
 "Fundamental Singleness: subjects as objects (how to turn the first two Paralogisms into valid arguments)" (2010), in The Metaphysics of Consciousness, ed. P. Basile et al.(Cambridge University Press), pp. 61–92.
 "Narrativity and non-Narrativity" (2010), in Wiley Interdisciplinary Reviews: Cognitive Science 1, pp. 775–80.
 "Cognitive phenomenology: real life" (2011), in Cognitive Phenomenology, ed.T. Bayne and M. Montague (Oxford University Press), pp. 285–325. 
 "The impossibility of ultimate responsibility?" in Free Will and Modern Science, ed. R. Swinburne (London: British Academy) (December), pp. 126–40.
 "Owning the Past: Reply to Stokes" (2011), Journal of Consciousness Studies 18, pp. 170–95.
 "The minimal self" (2011), in Oxford Handbook of the Self, ed. S. Gallagher (Oxford University Press), pp. 253–278.
 "Real naturalism" (2012), in Proceedings of the American Philosophical Association 86/2, pp. 125–154.
 "I and I: immunity to error through misidentification of the subject" (2012), in Immunity to Error Through Misidentification: New Essays, ed. S. Prosser and F. Recanati (Cambridge University Press)
 "All My Hopes Vanish: Hume’s Appendix" (2012), in The Continuum Companion to Hume, ed. A Bailey and D. O’Brien (London: Continuum)
 "We live beyond any tale that we happen to enact" (2012), in Harvard Review of Philosophy 18, pp. 73–90.
 "Free will" (2015), in Norton Introduction to Philosophy, ed. A. Byrne, J. Cohen, G. Rosen and S. Shiffrin (New York:Norton)
 "Real direct realism" (2015), in The Nature of Phenomenal Qualities, ed. P. Coates and S. Coleman (Oxford University Press)
 "Nietzsche’s metaphysics?" (2015), in Nietzsche on Mind and Nature, ed.M. Dries and P. Kail (Oxford University Press)
 "When I enter most intimately into what I call myself" (2015), in Oxford Handbook of David Hume ed. Paul Russell (Oxford University Press)
 ‘The unstoried life’ (2015), in On Life-Writing , ed. Z. Leader (Oxford: Oxford University Press)
 ‘“The secrets of all hearts”: Locke on personal identity’ (2015), in Mind, Self, and Person, ed. A. O'Hear (Cambridge: Cambridge University Press)
 ‘Mind and being: the primacy of panpsychism’, in Panpsychism: Philosophical Essays, ed. G. Bruntrup and L. Jaskolla (New York: Oxford University Press) 
 ‘The concept of consciousness in the twentieth century’ (2016), in Consciousness, ed. A. Simmons (New York: Oxford University Press) 
 ‘Narrative bypassing’, in A New Approach to Studies of the Self, ed. N. Praetorius, Journal of Consciousness Studies 16, pp. 125–139
‘Conceivability and the silence of physics’ (2017), Journal of Consciousness Studies
‘Descartes’s mind’ (2017) in Descartes and Cartesianism: Essays in Honour of Desmond Clarke, ed. S. Gaukroger and C. Wilson (Oxford: Oxford University Press)
‘Consciousness never left’ (2017), in The Return of Consciousness, ed. K. Almqvist and A. Haag (Stockholm: Axel and Margaret Axson Johnson Foundation)
‘Physicalist panpsychism’ (2017), in The Blackwell Companion to Consciousness, 2nd edn, ed. S. Schneider and M. Velmans (New York: Wiley-Blackwell)
‘What does “physical” mean? A prolegomenon to physicalist panpsychism’, in Routledge Handbook of Panpsychism [forthcoming]

See also
Epiphenomenalism
Free will
Immanuel Kant
Neuroscience of free will
Philosophical zombie

Notes

References
Feinberg, Joel; Shafer-Landau, Russ: Reason & Responsibility: Readings in Some Basic Problems of Philosophy: Thirteenth Edition (Thomson Wadsworth, 2008).

External links
 Galen Strawson Personal Website
 Galen Strawson at the University of Texas at Austin
 Galen Strawson at the University of Reading
 "Free Will" an entry by Strawson in the Routledge Encyclopedia of Philosophy
 "I am not a story"  an article by Strawson in Aeon magazine
 "You Cannot Make Yourself the Way You Are" – Strawson interviewed by Tamler Sommers, The Believer, March 2003 (Also published under the title "The Buck Stops—Where? Living Without Ultimate Moral Responsibility" at Naturalism.org).
 Good and Evil, 1 April 1999, BBC Radio program In Our Time
 Virtue, 28 February 2002, BBC Radio program In Our Time
 Free Will, 10 March 2011, BBC Radio program In Our Time
 Evil, 5 August 2015, BBC Radio Program Moral Maze
 "Things That Bother Me by Galen Strawson — a case for mistaken identity", 13 April 2018, Review of Things that Bother Me by Jonathan Derbyshire in the Financial Times 
 "Brimming with X", book review of Michael Pollan's How to Change Your Mind: The new science of psychedelics, in the Times Literary Supplement, August 8, 2018

1952 births
Living people
20th-century British philosophers
21st-century British philosophers
Academics of the University of Reading
Alumni of Trinity Hall, Cambridge
Analytic philosophers
British atheists
Fellows of Jesus College, Oxford
Panpsychism
Pantheon-Sorbonne University alumni
People educated at Winchester College
Philosophers of identity
Galen
University of Texas at Austin faculty